The 1898–99 season was the fourth competitive season in Belgian football.

Overview
Only one official division existed at the time, split into two leagues.  It was called Coupe de Championnat (Championship Cup) and its winner was decided after a two-legged final match between the winners of each league.

No team was relegated this season and only one new club was admitted for the next season (Skill F.C. de Bruxelles).

Honour

Final tables

League standings

Championship Group A

Championship Group B

Final

|}

External links
RSSSF archive - Final tables 1895-2002
Belgian clubs history

 
Seasons in Belgian football
1898–99 in European football by country